Connex may refer to:

Public transport 
 Veolia Transport, formerly Connex Group, now part of Transdev
 Connex Bus UK, a defunct bus operating company in Greater London, England
 Connex Melbourne, a former train operator in Australia
 Connex South Central, a defunct train operating company in England
 Connex South Eastern, a defunct train operating company in England
 MyBus, formerly Connex Transport Jersey, a defunct bus company in Jersey
 Transdev Germany, formerly Connex Germany, bus and train operator in Germany
 Transdev Auckland, formerly Connex Auckland, passenger train service in Auckland, New Zealand

Roads 
 NorthConnex, a tolled motorway tunnel in Sydney, Australia
 WestConnex, a road network under construction in Sydney, Australia

Other uses 
 Connex relation, a type of binary relation
 FIS CONNEX, an electronic funds transfer application package from EFD (eFunds Corporation)
 a fictitious energy company in the 2005 American film Syriana
 Connex GSM Romania, a Romanian mobile phone network operator

See also
Conex (disambiguation)
 KNX (standard)